Andreas Papathanasiou (born 3 October 1983, in Larnaca) is a Cypriot footballer who plays for Ermis Aradippou.

Club career
Papathanasiou was a key player for Ermis Aradippou and he was the top scorer in the second division for the last two seasons (2006–07, 2007–08).

APOEL offered him a 2 years contract in June 2008 and he join the club. In January 2009 he was given on loan back to Ermis Aradippou and helped the club to win the second division championship. In May 2009 he returned to APOEL and been part of the Champions of first division too. He also appeared in two official group stages matches of the 2009–10 UEFA Champions League with APOEL.

On Monday, 31 May 2010 Andreas signed a contract with Anorthosis Famagusta. He appeared only in three 2010–11 UEFA Europa League matches with Anorthosis and two months later, on 2 August 2010, the team manager Guillermo Angel Hoyos decided to put the player on loan to another team. So, he moved on loan for another time to  Ermis Aradippou for the 2010–11 season.

International career
He made his official debut for the national team on the World Cup Qualifier game against Ireland on October 15, 2008.

References

External links
 
 

1983 births
Living people
Cypriot footballers
Cyprus international footballers
Greek Cypriot people
Cypriot First Division players
APOEL FC players
Ermis Aradippou FC players
Alki Oroklini players
People from Larnaca
Association football forwards